The wives of Belgian monarchs have all been titled Queen and styled Majesty, with the exception of Leopold III of Belgium's second wife Mary Lilian Baels, who was titled Princess of Belgium and Princess of Réthy. All Belgian monarchs so far have been male, so there have only been female consorts.

See also
 Duchess of Brabant
 Countess of Flanders
 Countess of Hainaut

 
 
Belgium, Queen Consorts of
Belgium, List of royal consorts of